Ōfuna (大船) can refer to:
Ōfuna Kannon, a Buddhist temple in Kamakura, Kanagawa, Japan
Ōfuna Station, a railway station in Kamakura, Kanagawa, Japan
Ōfuna (Prisoner of War Camp), World War II prisoner of war camp